Kiewpayak is a retired Thai Muay Thai fighter. He currently teaches Muay Thai at Evolve MMA in Singapore.

Titles and accomplishments

2016 Lumpinee Stadium 112 lbs Champion
 2019 Sports Authority of Thailand Fighter of the Year

Fight record

|-  style="background:#fbb;"
| 2022-02-13|| Loss ||align=left| Kanongsuek Gor.Kampanat || Muaydee VitheeThai + Jitmuangnon, Or.Tor.Gor.3 Stadium || Nonthaburi province, Thailand || Decision|| 5 ||3:00

|- style="background:#cfc;"
|2021-12-10
|Win
| align="left" | Nabil VenumMuayThai
|Muaymanwsuk, Rangsit Stadium
|Rangsit, Thailand
|Decision
|5
|3:00
|-  style="background:#cfc;"
| 2021-10-14|| Win ||align=left| Kompatak SinbiMuayThai || Petchyindee + Muay Thai Moradok Kon Thai || Buriram Province, Thailand || Decision || 5 || 3:00 
|-  style="background:#fbb;"
| 2021-04-09|| Loss||align=left| Kompatak SinbiMuayThai || Muaymanwansuk Road Show || Songkhla, Thailand || Decision || 5 || 3:00
|-  style="background:#cfc;"
| 2020-12-05|| Win ||align=left| Kanongsuk Gor.Kampanat || Jitmuangnon + Sor.CafeMuayThai, Or.Tor.Gor3 Stadium || Nonthaburi province, Thailand || Decision || 5|| 3:00
|-  style="background:#fbb;"
| 2020-10-22|| Loss ||align=left| Lamnamoonlek Or.Atchariya  ||  Petchpatchara, Rajadamnern Stadium|| Bangkok, Thailand || KO (Left Cross)||3 ||
|-  style="background:#FFBBBB;"
| 2020-09-03|| Loss ||align=left| Chorfah Tor.Sangtiennoi || Rajadamnern Stadium || Bangkok, Thailand || KO (Right cross) || 3 ||
|-  style="background:#cfc;"
| 2020-08-01|| Win ||align=left| Lamnamoonlek Or.Atchariya || SuekJaoMuayThai, Siam Omnoi Stadium || Bangkok, Thailand || Decision (Split)|| 5|| 3:00
|-  style="background:#fbb;"
| 2020-02-28|| Loss ||align=left| Lamnamoonlek Or.Atchariya  || Ruamponkonchon Pratan Super Fight || Pathum Thani, Thailand || Decision||5 ||3:00
|-  style="background:#CCFFCC;"
| 2019-12-04|| Win ||align=left| Kongthoranee Sor.Sommai || Rajadamnern Stadium || Bangkok, Thailand || Decision (Unanimous) || 5 || 3:00
|-  style="background:#CCFFCC;"
| 2019-10-05|| Win ||align=left| Chalam Parunchai || Suek Muay Thai Vithee Isaan Tai || Buriram, Thailand || Decision || 5 || 3:00
|-  style="background:#c5d2ea;"
| 2019-09-12|| No Contest ||align=left| Chanasuek Kor.Kompanat || Rajadamnern Stadium || Bangkok, Thailand || || 2 ||
|-  style="background:#CCFFCC;"
| 2019-08-07|| Win ||align=left| Kompatak SinbiMuayThai  || Rajadamnern Stadium || Bangkok, Thailand || Decision || 5 || 3:00
|-  style="background:#CCFFCC;"
| 2019-06-26|| Win ||align=left| Chalam Parunchai || RuamponkonSamui + Kiatpetch Super Fight  || Surat Thani Province, Thailand || KO (Left elbow) || 3 ||
|-  style="background:#CCFFCC;"
| 2019-05-29|| Win ||align=left| Lamnamoonlek Or.Atchariya || Rajadamnern Stadium || Bangkok, Thailand || Decision || 5 || 3:00
|-  style="background:#CCFFCC;"
| 2019-02-28|| Win ||align=left| Kompatak SinbiMuayThai || Rajadamnern Stadium || Bangkok, Thailand || Decision || 5 || 3:00
|-  style="background:#CCFFCC;"
| 2019-01-31|| Win ||align=left| Suriyanlek Aor.Bor.Tor. Kampee || Rajadamnern Stadium || Bangkok, Thailand || Decision || 5 || 3:00
|-  style="background:#FFBBBB;"
| 2018-12-06|| Loss ||align=left| Chorfah Tor.Sangtiennoi || Rajadamnern Stadium || Bangkok, Thailand || KO (Right cross) || 3 ||
|-  style="background:#CCFFCC;"
| 2018-11-01|| Win||align=left| Yothin FA Group || Rajadamnern Stadium || Bangkok, Thailand || Decision  || 5 || 3:00
|-  style="background:#CCFFCC;"
| 2018-09-20|| Win ||align=left| Luknimit Singklongsi|| Rajadamnern Stadium || Bangkok, Thailand || Decision  || 5 || 3:00
|-  style="background:#CCFFCC;"
| 2018-05-30|| Win ||align=left| Morakot Petchsimuen || Rajadamnern Stadium || Bangkok, Thailand || Decision  || 5 || 3:00
|-  style="background:#CCFFCC;"
| 2018-04-09|| Win ||align=left| Yothin FA Group || Rajadamnern Stadium || Bangkok, Thailand || Decision  || 5 || 3:00
|-  style="background:#CCFFCC;"
| 2018-02-22 || Win ||align=left| Lamnamoonlek Or.Atchariya  || Rajadamnern Stadium || Bangkok, Thailand || Decision || 5 || 3:00
|-  style="background:#FFBBBB;"
| 2018-01-31 || Loss||align=left| Rungkit Wor.Sanprapai || Rajadamnern Stadium || Bangkok, Thailand || Decision || 5 || 3:00
|-  style="background:#CCFFCC;"
| 2017-12-27|| Win||align=left| Somraknoi Muay789 || Rajadamnern Stadium || Bangkok, Thailand || Decision  || 5 || 3:00
|-  style="background:#CCFFCC;"
| 2017-11-01|| Win ||align=left| Somraknoi Muay789 || Rajadamnern Stadium || Bangkok, Thailand || Decision  || 5 || 3:00
|-  style="background:#FFBBBB;"
| 2017-08-03|| Loss ||align=left| Prajanchai P.K.Saenchaimuaythaigym || Rajadamnern Stadium || Bangkok, Thailand || Decision  || 5 || 3:00
|-  style="background:#CCFFCC;"
| 2017-06-11|| Win||align=left| Prajanban Sor.Jor.Vichitpadriew || Rangsit Stadium || Rangsit, Thailand || Decision  || 5 || 3:00
|-  style="background:#CCFFCC;"
| 2017-05-04|| Win||align=left| Yothin FA Group || Rajadamnern Stadium || Bangkok, Thailand || Decision  || 5 || 3:00
|-  style="background:#FFBBBB;"
| 2017-03-15|| Loss||align=left| Yothin FA Group || Rajadamnern Stadium || Bangkok, Thailand || Decision  || 5 || 3:00
|-  style="background:#FFBBBB;"
| 2017-02-07|| Loss||align=left| Yothin FA Group || Lumpinee Stadium || Bangkok, Thailand || Decision  || 5 || 3:00
|-  style="background:#CCFFCC;"
| 2016-12-12|| Win ||align=left| Palangpon PetchyindeeAcademy || Rajadamnern Stadium ||Bangkok, Thailand || Decision || 5 || 3:00
|-  style="background:#FFBBBB;"
| 2016-11-14|| Loss ||align=left| Palangpon PetchyindeeAcademy  || Rajadamnern Stadium ||Bangkok, Thailand || Decision || 5 || 3:00
|-  style="background:#CCFFCC;"
| 2016-09-28|| Win ||align=left| Watcharaphon P.K.Senchai   || Rajadamnern Stadium ||Bangkok, Thailand || Decision || 5 || 3:00
|-  style="background:#CCFFCC;"
| 2016-09-02|| Win ||align=left| Ronachai Tor.Ramintra  || Lumpinee Stadium ||Bangkok, Thailand || Decision || 5 || 3:00
|-
! style=background:white colspan=9 | 
|-  style="background:#c5d2ea;"
| 2016-08-02|| Draw ||align=left| Petchrung Sitnayokkaipadriew  || Lumpinee Stadium ||Bangkok, Thailand || Decision || 5 || 3:00
|-  style="background:#CCFFCC;"
| 2016-07-06|| Win ||align=left| Wanchai Kiatmuu9 || Rajadamnern Stadium ||Bangkok, Thailand || Decision || 5 || 3:00
|-  style="background:#FFBBBB;"
| 2016-05-26|| Loss ||align=left| Phetmuangchon Por.Suantong  || Rajadamnern Stadium ||Bangkok, Thailand || Decision || 5 || 3:00
|-  style="background:#FFBBBB;"
| 2016-05-02|| Loss ||align=left| Ronachai Tor.Ramintra  || Rajadamnern Stadium ||Bangkok, Thailand || Decision || 5 || 3:00
|-  style="background:#FFBBBB;"
| 2016-03-29|| Loss ||align=left| Ronachai Tor.Ramintra  || Lumpinee Stadium ||Bangkok, Thailand || Decision || 5 || 3:00
|-  style="background:#CCFFCC;"
| 2016-03-02|| Win  ||align=left| Ronachai Tor.Ramintra  || Rajadamnern Stadium ||Bangkok, Thailand || Decision || 5 || 3:00
|-  style="background:#CCFFCC;"
| 2016-01-26|| Win  ||align=left| Banlangngoen Sawansrangmunja  || Lumpinee Stadium ||Bangkok, Thailand || Decision || 5 || 3:00
|-  style="background:#FFBBBB;"
| 2015-12-22|| Loss ||align=left| Banlangngoen Sawansrangmunja  || Lumpinee Stadium ||Bangkok, Thailand || Decision || 5 || 3:00
|-  style="background:#CCFFCC;"
| 2015-11-03|| Win ||align=left| Petchrung Sitnayokkaipadriew  || Lumpinee Stadium ||Bangkok, Thailand || Decision || 5 || 3:00
|-  style="background:#CCFFCC;"
| 2015-09-11|| Win ||align=left| KoKo Paemeanburi  || Lumpinee Stadium ||Bangkok, Thailand || Decision || 5 || 3:00
|-  style="background:#FFBBBB;"
| 2015-08-03|| Loss ||align=left| Chaiyo PetchyindeeAcademy  || Rajadamnern Stadium ||Bangkok, Thailand || Decision || 5 || 3:00
|-  style="background:#CCFFCC;"
| 2015-07-10|| Win ||align=left| Phetpangan Mor.Ratanabandit || Lumpinee Stadium ||Bangkok, Thailand || Decision || 5 || 3:00
|-  style="background:#CCFFCC;"
| 2015-05-20|| Win ||align=left| Nengern Lukjaomaesaivari  || Rajadamnern Stadium ||Bangkok, Thailand || Decision || 5 || 3:00
|-  style="background:#FFBBBB;"
| 2015-04-07|| Loss ||align=left| Chaiyo PetchyindeeAcademy  || Lumpinee Stadium ||Bangkok, Thailand || Decision || 5 || 3:00
|-  style="background:#CCFFCC;"
| 2015-03-06|| Win ||align=left| Chaiyo PetchyindeeAcademy  || Lumpinee Stadium ||Bangkok, Thailand || Decision || 5 || 3:00
|-  style="background:#CCFFCC;"
| 2015-01-15|| Win ||align=left| Raktukkon RajahbatUniversity || Rajadamnern Stadium ||Bangkok, Thailand || Decision || 5 || 3:00
|-  style="background:#CCFFCC;"
| 2014-11-24|| Win ||align=left| Phetpanang Sor.Suradet || Rajadamnern Stadium ||Bangkok, Thailand || Decision || 5 || 3:00
|-  style="background:#FFBBBB;"
| 2014-09-11|| Loss ||align=left| Kongthoranee Sor.Sommai || Rajadamnern Stadium ||Bangkok, Thailand || Decision || 5 || 3:00
|-  style="background:#FFBBBB;"
| 2014-06-26|| Loss ||align=left| Kongthoranee Sor.Sommai || Rajadamnern Stadium ||Bangkok, Thailand || Decision || 5 || 3:00
|-
| colspan=9 | Legend:

References

Kiewpayak Jitmuangnon
Living people
1999 births